Dakota Prukop (born October 17, 1993) is an American professional gridiron football quarterback for the New Jersey Generals of the United States Football League (USFL). He played college football for Montana State from 2013 to 2015 and for Oregon in 2016. Prukop has also been a member of the Toronto Argonauts, Calgary Stampeders, Edmonton Elks, and Winnipeg Blue Bombers of the Canadian Football League (CFL).

College career
Prukop transferred to the University of Oregon upon his graduation from Montana State University. Prukop announced his intentions to transfer to Oregon on December 15, 2015. On January 5, 2016, Prukop began classes at Oregon, officially joining the football team. After struggling in the Ducks' fifth game against Washington State, Prukop was benched and freshman quarterback Justin Herbert took over for the rest of the year.

Statistics

Professional career

Toronto Argonauts
On May 23, 2017, Prukop signed with the Toronto Argonauts of the CFL. He played in nine games as the third-string quarterback, but also saw time on special teams, recording six special teams tackles for the year. While he didn't dress in any playoff games, he was a member of the 105th Grey Cup championship team in 2017. In 2018, he began the year as the fourth-string quarterback again, but was promoted to the active roster and regularly dressed as the third-string quarterback due to an injury to the team's starter, Ricky Ray. Following the Ray's retirement, Prukop became the team's third-string quarterback entering the 2019 Toronto Argonauts season, but was soon elevated to back up following an injury to starter, James Franklin. He saw his first action at quarterback on July 25, 2019 against the Edmonton Eskimos in relief of McLeod Bethel-Thompson, but he threw two interceptions and the team lost 26-0. Later that season, after the Argonauts had been eliminated from post-season contention, he again saw game action and threw his first career touchdown pass to Rodney Smith on a 13-yard completion on October 26, 2019 against the Ottawa Redblacks. As a pending free agent in 2020, he was released during the free agency negotiation window on February 7, 2020.

Calgary Stampeders
On February 11, 2020, Prukop signed with the Calgary Stampeders. He did not play in 2020 due to the cancellation of the 2020 CFL season and re-signed with the Stampeders on January 8, 2021. However, he was released near the end of training camp on July 29, 2021.

Edmonton Elks
On July 30, 2021, it was announced that Prukop had signed with the Edmonton Elks. He played in eight regular season games where he completed 18 of 26 pass attempts for 183 yards with one touchdown and two interceptions. He was released on February 14, 2022.

Winnipeg Blue Bombers
On February 15, 2022, it was announced that Prukop had signed with the Winnipeg Blue Bombers to a one-year contract. With the potential of an impending CBA lockout Prukop attended the Bombers' rookie training camp, contrary to the recommendation by the Players' Association who advised that veteran quarterbacks abstain from attending their teams' rookie camps. Prukop stated that he did not want to jeoprodise his opportunity to make the roster as a veteran quarterback behind Zach Collaros. He played in 12 regular season games where he completed seven of 14 pass attempts for 181 yards and two touchdowns. He was also featured heavily in the short yardage unit where he had 53 carries for 209 yards and six touchdowns. Prukop also played in the 109th Grey Cup game where he had five carries for nine yards and two touchdowns, but had two pass attempts with no completions and one interception in the loss to the Toronto Argonauts. He became a free agent upon the expiry of his contract on February 14, 2023.

New Jersey Generals
On March 14, 2023, Prukop signed with the New Jersey Generals of the United States Football League (USFL).

References

External links
 Winnipeg Blue Bombers bio
 Montana State Bobcats bio
 Oregon Ducks bio

1993 births
Living people
Players of American football from Austin, Texas
American football quarterbacks
Canadian football quarterbacks
American players of Canadian football
Montana State Bobcats football players
Oregon Ducks football players
Toronto Argonauts players
Calgary Stampeders players
Edmonton Elks players
Winnipeg Blue Bombers players
New Jersey Generals (2022) players